João Olavo Soares de Souza (born 27 May 1988) is a Brazilian former professional tennis player. Before receiving a lifetime ban for match-fixing, Souza competed mainly on the ATP Challenger Tour, both in singles and doubles. He reached his highest ATP singles ranking, No. 69, on April 6, 2015, and his highest ATP doubles ranking, No. 70, on January 7, 2013. Souza was coached by former Brazilian player Ricardo Acioly. Souza is also known as "Feijão" (Portuguese for Bean).

Career
In 2011, he qualified to the US Open, but was defeated in the first round by wildcard Robby Ginepri 3–6, 4–6, 7–6, 1–6.

In the 2014 season, Souza beat world No. 45, Robin Haase in round of 32 of the ATP 250 São Paulo. Later he reached semifinals at the Marburg, Scheveningen and Poznan Challengers. At the Medellin Challenger, he beat Facundo Bagnis in semifinals and lost to Austin Krajicek in the final. He reached semifinals at the Quito Challenger.

In 2015, he played in the longest singles match in Davis Cup history, losing to Leonardo Mayer in 6 hours and 42 minutes, 6–7(4), 6–7(5), 7–5, 7–5, 13–15.

In 2016, he won the 2016 International Tennis Tournament of Cortina on the ATP Challenger Tour, beating Laslo Đere in the final in straight sets.

In January 2020, the Tennis Integrity Unit announced that Souza had been issued a lifetime ban after conviction on match-fixing charges.

ATP career finals

Doubles: 1 (1 runner-up)

Futures & Challenger finals

Singles: 22 (14–8)

Doubles: 22 (11–11)

Singles performance timeline

''Current till 2016 US Open.

References

External links

See also
Match fixing in tennis
Tennis Integrity Unit

1988 births
Living people
Brazilian male tennis players
People from Mogi das Cruzes
Sportspeople from Rio de Janeiro (city)
Tennis players at the 2011 Pan American Games
Pan American Games competitors for Brazil
Match fixers
Sportspeople banned for life